Rangers FC Superleague Formula team was the open wheel single seater motor racing team of Rangers. The Rangers racing team competes in the Superleague Formula. It has been operated by Alan Docking Racing for all seasons, although Team West-Tec operated the Rangers team in 2008 pre-season. The car was revealed outside Ibrox Stadium with the Rangers first team present, including manager Walter Smith.
Rangers Football Club had a team in the Superleague Formula race car series. The Rangers F.C. team had been operated by Alan Docking Racing. In 2008 Ryan Dalziel drove for Rangers F.C. in the team's maiden season. James Walker also drove for the team in one round of the 2008 season and posted their best result, a fourth-place finish.

2008 season
In 2008 Ryan Dalziel drove for Rangers F.C. in the team's maiden season finished overall in the mid table in 13th. It was only 1 of 3 teams that completed the whole season (a world record at the time) but did not get on to the podium. James Walker also drove for the team in one round of the 2008 season and posted their best result, a fourth-place finish.

2009 season
For the 2009 Superleague Formula season, John Martin was the driver. For the first round of the season Rangers F.C. had a bad weekend. In race one Rangers got caught up in a mistake from Olympiacos CFP (Davide Rigon) eliminating them from the race. In race 2 Rangers F.C. led after lap 1 and built up a lead before the pitstop window opened. The car got stuck on the jack in the pits and lost 35 seconds coming out in 13th place. After that driver John Martin made a small mistake putting Rangers F.C. out of the race.

At the Zolder round Rangers F.C. got to their first 'Pole Shoot Out' of qualifying and narrowly lost out on pole to FC Midtjylland (Kasper Andersen). John Martin and Rangers F.C. followed this up with a debut podium finishing in 2nd place. In the second race of the day at Circuit Zolder Rangers F.C. retired early with gearbox problems.

At the Donington round Rangers F.C. and John Martin claimed their 2nd podium in Superleague Formula. They were in position to win race one before being impeded by PSV Eindhoven (Dominick Muermans) allowing FC Basel to get their first win. Rangers F.C. finished 2nd. In race two John Martin and Rangers F.C. crashed into A.C. Milan (Giorgio Pantano) ending both teams races. In the 6 car 'Super Final' Rangers F.C. and John Martin claimed their very first Superleague Formula win, passing FC Basel 1893 (Max Wissel) with 2 laps to go.

At the Estoril round it was the first time Rangers F.C. finished both races this season. They claimed a 5th place and an 8th place. During race two Rangers F.C. had an incident with Atlético Madrid (María de Villota) which sent both teams spinning and dropping a couple of places.

For the 2009 season, the team were much more successful with Australian driver John Martin posting three podium places including one win at Donington Park.

The Rangers team did not compete in the 2010 Superleague Formula season as it was not named in the provisional entry list, which included which race teams might operate each car.

Record
(key)

2008

2009
Super Final results in 2009 did not count for points towards the main championship.

References

Rangers F.C.
Superleague Formula club teams
2008 establishments in Scotland